The Margin is a live album by Peter Hammill, documenting early nineteen-eighties concerts by his K Group. Hammill used the alias K (on vocals, piano and guitar), Nic Potter was Mozart (on bass guitar), Guy Evans was Brain (on drums), and John Ellis was Fury (on backing vocals and guitar). The album was originally released as a double album on Foundry Records in 1985. It was reissued some years later on CD on Virgin Records in the UK with one track missing in order to make it fit onto a single CD and on Line Records in Germany with two tracks missing. Hammill then reissued it again on his own Fie! record label, as The Margin +. This issue did not restore the track lost from the UK CD edition from the original vinyl release, "The Second Hand", but included an additional disc of material previously released as a live bootleg called The Secret Asteroid Jungle. The liner notes explain that Hammill chose to include a different performance of "The Second Hand".

The original album (and the first disc of The Margin +) is a live-recording without audience sounds ("No applause, no overdubs - This is what happened on stage"), the additional disc of The Margin + does have audience sounds ("Applause, no overdubs - This is what happened out front").

The album cover is a stark black and white photograph of Hammill by the noted Dutch photographer Anton Corbijn. It has become an iconic image of Hammill, often used for live posters and other promotional material.

Track listing

The Margin 

 "The Future Now" (3:46)
 "Porton Down" (5:38)
 "Stranger Still" (6:22)
 "Sign" (6:36)
 "Jargon King" (3:15)
 "The Second Hand" (5:57) (missing on the CD reissue)
 "Empress's Clothes" (5:49)
 "The Sphinx In The Face" (5:12)
 "Labour Of Love" (5:48)
 "Sitting Targets" (5:44)
 "Patient" (7:28)
 "Flight" (20:35)

+ 

 "The Second Hand" (6:03)
 "My Experience" (4:13)
 "Paradox Drive" (4:18)
 "Modern" (7:42)
 "Film Noir" (5:06)
 "The Great Experiment" (5:47)
 "Happy Hour" (9:46)
 "Central Hotel" (5:01)
 "Again" (4:22)
 "If I Could" (5:52)

Personnel 
The K Group
 Peter Hammill - vocals, guitar, piano
 John Ellis - lead guitar and backing vocals
 Nic Potter - bass guitar
 Guy Evans - drums, percussion

References 

Peter Hammill live albums
1985 live albums